Norman Graham Freudenberg  (12 May 1934 – 26 July 2019) was an Australian author and political speechwriter who worked with the Australian Labor Party for over forty years, beginning when he was appointed Arthur Calwell's press secretary in June 1961.

Early life
Freudenberg was born in Brisbane. His father was a soldier who fought at Gallipoli and, being a patriot, he named his son after a former colonial Governor of Queensland, Field Marshall Sir Henry Norman. Freudenberg was educated at the Church of England Grammar School in Brisbane. He then studied journalism in Melbourne and  worked for some years with the Melbourne Sun.

Career
Freudenberg wrote over a thousand speeches for several leaders of the Australian Labor Party at both the New South Wales state and federal level. Senior Labor Party leaders for whom he prepared speeches included Arthur Calwell, Gough Whitlam, Neville Wran, Bob Hawke, Barrie Unsworth, Bob Carr and Simon Crean. He was "centrally involved" in policy speeches for fourteen federal elections and nine New South Wales state elections. Freudenberg was principal speechwriter for the leading campaign "It's Time" speech that Labor leader Gough Whitlam presented at the launch of the Labor campaign for the 1972 Australian federal election.

In 1990 he was appointed a Member of the Order of Australia (AM) in recognition of "services to journalism, to parliament, and to politics".

From 1995–1998 he served on the council of the National Library of Australia.

In June 2005, Freudenberg was inducted as a lifetime member of the Australian Labor Party (New South Wales Branch).

He won the 2009 Walkley Book Award for Churchill and Australia.

Death
He lived in retirement on Bribie Island, Queensland. Freudenberg died on 26 July 2019, aged 85, after a long illness.

Books by Freudenberg
 A Certain Grandeur – Gough Whitlam in Politics (1977)
 Cause for Power – the Centenary History of the NSW Labor Party (1991) 
 A Figure of Speech (2005)  (autobiography)
 Churchill and Australia (2008)

References

External links
Whitlam Institute

1934 births
2019 deaths
20th-century Australian journalists
Australian biographers
Male biographers
Gough Whitlam
Speechwriters
Members of the Order of Australia
People educated at Anglican Church Grammar School
Writers from Brisbane